Puerto Rico Highway 178 (PR-178) is the main access to downtown Arroyo, Puerto Rico. This road extends from PR-3 in Guásimas to returning again to PR-3 at its junction with PR-753 between downtown, Pitahaya and Palmas barrios.

Major intersections

See also

 List of highways numbered 178

References

External links
 

178
Arroyo, Puerto Rico